Larissa Fais Munhoz Araújo (born 1 July 1992) is a Brazilian handball player who plays as a left wing for Liga Națională club HC Dunarea Braila and the Brazilian national team.

Achievements
Liga Națională: 
Bronze Medalist: 2018
Nemzeti Bajnokság I: 
Bronze Medalist: 2017

References

External links
 
 

 

1992 births
Living people
Brazilian female handball players
Expatriate handball players
Brazilian expatriate sportspeople in Hungary
Sportspeople from Curitiba
Brazilian expatriate sportspeople in Romania
Handball players at the 2019 Pan American Games
Pan American Games medalists in handball
Pan American Games gold medalists for Brazil
CS Minaur Baia Mare (women's handball) players
Medalists at the 2019 Pan American Games
Handball players at the 2020 Summer Olympics
21st-century Brazilian women